Charles Curran may refer to:
 Charles Curran (broadcaster) (1921–1980), BBC Director-General 1969–1977
 Charles Curran (politician) (1903–1972), British Conservative politician, MP for Uxbridge 1959–1966
 Charles Curran (theologian) (born 1934), American Catholic moral theologian
 Charles A. Curran (1913–1978), American psychologist and Jesuit priest
 Charles Courtney Curran (1861–1942), American painter
 Charles Howard Curran (1894–1972), Canadian entomologist
 Chuck Curran (born 1939), American Republican politician in Ohio